Craigside is a small village in County Durham, England. It is situated close to the River Wear, west of Crook.

References

Villages in County Durham
Wolsingham